Pseudofumaria is a genus of herbaceous perennial plants native to Europe, formerly included in the genus Corydalis.

There are two species: 
Pseudofumaria alba (Mill.) Lidén (syn. Corydalis ochroleuca)northwest Balkans
Pseudofumaria lutea (L.) Borkh (syn. Corydalis lutea)Switzerland and Italy

References

Fumarioideae
Papaveraceae genera